The 2008 California Republican presidential primary was held on February 5, 2008, with a total of 173 national delegates at stake.

Process 
The delegates represented California at the Republican National Convention. There were three delegates to every congressional district and fourteen bonus delegates. The winner in each of the 53 congressional districts was awarded all of that district's delegates. The statewide winner was awarded 11 of the 14 statewide delegates, with the 3 remaining delegates assigned to party leaders. Voting in the primary was restricted to registered Republican voters.

Polls 

Early polls showed Rudy Giuliani in the lead. Polls taken closer to the primary either showed Mitt Romney or John McCain as the favored candidate.

Results

See also
California Democratic primary, 2008
California state elections, February 2008
Republican Party (United States) presidential primaries, 2008
United States presidential election in California, 2008

References

Republican primary
California
2008
2008 Super Tuesday